The Sky Is Beyond the Clouds is a 1973 Soviet drama film directed by Yuri Yegorov.

Plot 
The film tells about pilots and designers who, after the war, tried out new jet technology.

Cast 
 Gennady Sayfulin		
 Sergey Nikonenko	
 Larisa Malevannaya	
 Igor Yasulovich
 Naina Honina
 Elena Sanaeva		
 Mikhail Gluzskiy	
 Vladislav Dvorzhetskiy		
 Yury Nazarov
 Nikolay Volkov

References

External links 
 

1973 films
1970s Russian-language films
Soviet drama films
1973 drama films